Plagioscyphus is a genus of flowering plants belonging to the family Sapindaceae.

Its native range is Madagascar.

Species:

Plagioscyphus cauliflorus 
Plagioscyphus jumellei 
Plagioscyphus louvelii

References

Sapindaceae
Sapindaceae genera